Robert William Lawson (c.1889–1960) was a British physicist, a fellow of Institute of Physics when it was founded.

References

Further reading

1880s births
1960 deaths
British physicists